The Telangana Communist Party (TCP) is a political party in the Indian state of Andhra Pradesh. TCP works for the creation of a separate Telangana state. The leader of TCP is S. Venkat Swamy.

TCP is a member of Telangana Rashtra Sadhana Front.

TCP was registered to participate in the 2005 municipal elections in Andhra Pradesh. It was allotted the 'cake' as its electoral symbol.

In April 2011, the Hyderabad and Ranga Reddy district committee members of the Marxist Communist Party of India (United) joined the TCP in protest against the refusal of MCPI(U) to support the struggle for a separate Telangana state.

References

Political parties established in 2005
Political parties in Telangana
Communist parties in India
2005 establishments in Andhra Pradesh